Nesomomus is a genus of beetles in the family Cerambycidae, containing the following species:

 Nesomomus fasciculosus Breuning, 1956
 Nesomomus servus Pascoe, 1864

References

Acanthocinini